Lieutenant General William Wilson "Buffalo Bill" Quinn (November 1, 1907 – September 11, 2000) was a United States Army officer, who served in intelligence during World War II. Born in Crisfield, Somerset, Maryland and a 1933 graduate of West Point, Quinn retired as a lieutenant general on March 1, 1966 as the commanding general of the Seventh United States Army. He died in Washington, DC at Walter Reed Army Hospital at 92 years old.

Education
Quinn graduated from Crisfield High with the class of 1925 and then from United States Military Academy with the class of 1933, and in 1938 attended United States Army Infantry School. In 1942 he graduated from Command and General Staff College. In August 1947 he graduated from the National War College.

Commands held
From 1933–1935 at Fort McKinley Quinn was the commanding officer of Company L, 5th Infantry Regiment. 1935–1936 General Quinn was assigned to Company D and then from 1936–1938 assigned to the Headquarters Company of the 31st Infantry Regiment. In 1940 he was the Command of Headquarters Company of the 4th Infantry Division, and the Commanding Officers of Company D, 8th Infantry Division. In July 1942 he became the Chief of Staff of the G-2, IV Army Corps.

In 1949 Quinn was the Commanding Officer of the 3rd Battalion, 34th Infantry Regiment. In April 1949 he became Chief of the Training Sub-section, I Corps.  In January 1950 he became the Assistant Chief of Staff of the G-3, I Corps from February to March.  In January 1951, Quinn was the Commanding Officer of the 17th Infantry Regiment, 7th Infantry Division in Korea. In 1952 Quinn became the Deputy Chief of Staff of the Pentagon and Deputy Chief of Staff for Planning Coordination of the Office of Chief of Staff, and then eventually became the Chief of Staff of the Pentagon. In 1953 Quinn was transferred to Greece and to be the Head of the Army Section, Joint Military Aid Group to Greece. 

In January 1957 he was the Commanding Officer of the 4th Infantry Division of the Strategic Army Corps at Fort Lewis. In July 1958 he became the Deputy Chief of Staff for the G-2 Intelligence of the United States Army.  From 1959–1961, Quinn served as the Army's Chief of Information, and in 1959 he became the Chief of Public Information of the Department of the Army. In 1961 Quinn became the Deputy Director of the Defense Intelligence Agency and promoted to lieutenant general. 

From 1964–1966, Quinn was the Commanding General of the United States Army Europe and Seventh United States Army, commonly referred to as 7th Army, in Stuttgart-Vaihingen, Germany. 

On March 1, 1966 Quinn retired and became Honorary Colonel of the 17th Infantry, nicknamed "The Buffalos". 

Following his retirement from the Army, he served as chief of operations of the Central Intelligence Agency.

World War II
Quinn participated in the Battle of the Bulge, Operation Dragoon and on January 1, 1945 he was part of Operation Northwind. He helped liberate the Dachau concentration camp, later saying "'the atrocities […] were just too horrible to describe." Seeing the need to document and preserve what he saw, Quinn commissioned the Dachau report.

Korea
Quinn was in Korea from 1951 to 1952 and in August 1951 Quinn was wounded in Korea. While in Korea he was awarded the Silver Star, Legion of Merit and the Bronze Star with the "V" Device. He was also in the Battle of Inchon. While he was in Korea he was the commanding Officer of the 17th Infantry Regiment which was part of the 7th Infantry Division (the 17th Infantry was, and still is, nicknamed "the Buffalos").

Occupations
He was Vice President of the Aerospace Group program at Martin Marietta Corporation until 1972; and then afterwards he established Quinn Associates, a consulting firm.

Awards and decorations

Personal

Quinn was married to Sara Bette Williams, who is buried next to him at Arlington National Cemetery. Together they had three children: Donna, William Jr., and Sally Quinn.

References

External links
 Arlington National Cemetery
 Quinn portrait from Fort Lewis

1907 births
2000 deaths
Military personnel from Maryland
Burials at Arlington National Cemetery
Martin Marietta people
Military intelligence
People from Crisfield, Maryland
Recipients of the Air Medal
Recipients of the Distinguished Service Medal (US Army)
Recipients of the Legion of Merit
Recipients of the Silver Star
United States Army generals
United States Army personnel of World War II